The 5th Senate district of Wisconsin is one of 33 districts in the Wisconsin State Senate.  Located in southeast Wisconsin, the district is composed of parts of western Milwaukee County, and eastern Waukesha County.  It includes the cities of Brookfield, New Berlin, and Wauwatosa, as well as most of the city of West Allis.

Current elected officials
Rob Hutton is the senator representing the 5th district since January 2023.  He previously served eight years in the Wisconsin State Assembly, representing the 13th Assembly district from 2013 to 2021.

Each Wisconsin State Senate district is composed of three State Assembly districts.  The 5th Senate district comprises the 13th, 14th, and 15th Assembly districts.  The current representatives of those districts are: 
 Assembly District 13: Tom Michalski (R–Elm Grove)
 Assembly District 14: Robyn Vining (D–Wauwatosa)
 Assembly District 15: Dave Maxey (R–New Berlin)

The district is located mostly within Wisconsin's 5th congressional district, which is represented by U.S. Representative Scott L. Fitzgerald.

Past senators

A list of all previous senators from this district:

Notes

External links
constituency site
district map

Wisconsin State Senate districts
Milwaukee County, Wisconsin
Waukesha County, Wisconsin
1848 establishments in Wisconsin